Schinia reniformis is a moth of the family Noctuidae. It is found in North America including Oklahoma and Utah.

The wingspan is about 20 mm.

External links
Images
Bug Guide

Schinia
Moths of North America
Moths described in 1900